Križevci Synagogue is a former synagogue and current youth center in Križevci, Croatia.

Salamon Lipmann was the first Jew who settled in Križevci around 1780. In 1844, Adam Breyer founded the Jewish community Križevci. He organized, in his house, the first Križevci house of prayer for the members of the community. On November 15, 1894, with presence of Križevci mayor Ferdo Vukić, general assembly of the Jewish community talked and adopted the proposed development of the new synagogue. Architecture studio Hönigsberg & Deutsch was selected to build the new synagogue, and furniture company Bothe & Ehrmann to adapt the interior. Construction began on May 14, 1895 and four months later the synagogue was built on September 15, 1895 at the Strossmayer square. The consecration of the new synagogue and Torah transfer from old house of prayer took place on September 16, 1895. The synagogue was filled to its utmost capacity with a great crowd gathered outside.

In 1941, during World War II, the Independent State of Croatia authorities have left synagogue robbed and devastated.  Two torahs have been saved by Adela Weisz with the help from her non-Jewish friends, which are now located at the Jewish museum in Belgrade.  After the war in 1945, the synagogue was taken by Križevci national committee.  In agreement with the Federation of Jewish Communities of Yugoslavia, the synagogue served as a building for cultural events.

Today, synagogue serves as a youth center. In November 2012, it was published that the synagogue will receive funds from the European Union for the thorough outside and inside restoration.  After restoration synagogue will serve as the new headquarters for Križevci Tourist Board and local community sports associations.

Gallery

References

Ashkenazi Jewish culture in Croatia
Ashkenazi synagogues
Synagogues completed in 1895
Former synagogues in Croatia
Synagogue
Buildings and structures demolished in 1941
Hönigsberg & Deutsch buildings
Buildings and structures in Koprivnica-Križevci County